Laurence Green may refer to:

Laurie Green, bishop
Laurence Green (director), see Ryan Larkin#Ryan, the film

See also
Lawrence Green (disambiguation)
Larry Green (disambiguation)